The men's 5000 metres at the 2014 IPC Athletics European Championships was held at the Swansea University Stadium from 18–23 August. There were final events taken place; no heat events were contested.

Medalists

Results

T11

T13

T54

See also
List of IPC world records in athletics

References

5000 metres
5000 metres at the World Para Athletics European Championships